The Society of Devotees of the Islamic Revolution is a conservative Iranian political party. It is informally referred to as the Isargaran, a word which connotes altruism in Persian and is associated with other political movements. Many members of the party are veterans of the Iran–Iraq War. It is one of the most powerful and least discussed movements in Iran.

Mahmoud Ahmadinejad was a founding member of the party.

Electoral results

Party leaders

References

Principlist political groups in Iran
Political parties established in 1995
1995 establishments in Iran